Zangabad may refer to:
 Zangabad, East Azerbaijan
 Zangabad, Kurdistan
 Zangabad, Piranshahr, West Azerbaijan Province
 Zangabad, Urmia, West Azerbaijan Province